The Thorn Ministry was the government of Luxembourg between 15 June 1974 and 16 July 1979.  It was led by, and named after, Prime Minister Gaston Thorn.  Throughout the ministry, Thorn's Democratic Party formed a coalition with the Luxembourg Socialist Workers' Party (LSAP).  At first, the Deputy Prime Minister was Raymond Vouel, but he left to become European Commissioner in 1976, and was replaced by Bernard Berg.

The Ministry was formed after the election of 1974, which saw the Christian Social People's Party (CSV) remain the largest single party, but without a majority of seats in the legislature.

Formation 
The election of 26 May 1974 turned the Luxembourgish political landscape on its head. The CSV, which had been the senior partner in all governments since 1944, went into opposition. It lost three Deputies since the previous election, and received 29,9% of the vote, while the Democratic Party emerged the winner of the election, gaining three seats, and receiving 23,3% of the vote. The LSAP managed to limit its losses, losing one seat, despite the splintering off of the Social Democratic Party, which fielded its own candidates and received 5 seats.

Under Gaston Thorn, the DP and LSAP formed for the first time since the war a coalition without the CSV. The Thorn cabinet was reshuffled twice during the legislature. Raymond Vouel, the Deputy Prime Minister, resigned on 21 July 1976 do become a member of the Commission of the European Communities. Jacques F. Poos, the former editor of the Tageblatt, took his place as Minister of Finances. On 16 September 1977, after the departure of Marcel Mart for the European Court of Auditors, Josy Barthel joined the government.

Domestic policy 
The liberal-socialist government enacted reforms of divorce laws, abortion laws and the penal code. In 1974, adultery was decriminalised. The laws of 6 February 1975 and 5 December 1978 allowed divorce by mutual consent and for a specific reason (such as the couple not having lived together for three years). The law of 15 November 1978 legalised abortion, over the vehement opposition of the CSV's Deputies, who raised concerns over the life of the unborn child. In 1979, the death penalty was formally abolished.

In parallel with these changes in family and marriage law, the government was concerned with the demographic evolution of the country. Since the mid-1960s, fertility had continually declined. The birth rate, one of the lowest in Europe, was no longer enough to replace the generations, and pointed towards an ageing of the population. This deficit could only be remedied by an increase in immigration. To find solutions to the demographic crisis, the government asked an international expert, professor Gérard Calot, to report on the state of the Luxembourgish family and the problem of the declining birth rate. The conclusions he came to advocated an active family policy, the costs of which would however be difficult to sustain in times of economic crisis.

To preserve a level of pluralism in the press, the government introduced direct subsidies for newspapers. The formula for calculating this was advantageous to publications with a small readership, and counterbalanced to an extent the growing commercial success of the main daily newspaper, the Luxemburger Wort, close to the CSV. (see Press subsidy in Luxembourg)

The government was forced to abandon two large-scale infrastructure projects in the face of popular opposition. In 1977, it cancelled plans for a nuclear power plant in Remerschen. This project had faced criticism from the anti-nuclear movement, partly due to the context of the Three Mile Island accident in the United States. Another project that caused controversy was that of the "Centre 300", a planned home for the European Parliament, designed by the French architect Taillibert.

Economic policy 
The start of the new government coincided with the beginnings of the economic crisis. From late 1974, the prices and exports in the steel sector sank. The value of steel production sank by 33% in 1975, and GDP decreased by 6,1%. In late 1975, inflation rose above 10%. However, this time it was not merely a market readjustment, but the crisis was structural in nature. The decline in steel production turned out to be permanent, and irreversible. From 1974 to 1992, steel production decreased by more than 50%, from 6,4 to 3,07 million tonnes. Over the same period, ARBED cut back its work force by more than two-thirds, from 27,000 to 8,100. The role of the Thorn government, and subsequent governments, was to consist of managing the crisis such as to avoid mass layoffs, and to guide the transition towards a post-industrial economy.

In July 1975, the government introduced a law allowing it to take measures to avoid layoffs and to assure full employment. This law also established an "economic committee" charged with closely monitoring the economic situation. A second law opened a budget credit of 250 million francs to finance extraordinary works in the general interest. In 1977, faced with the worsening of the steel crisis, the government created a new body for dialogue and consultation: a Tripartite Coordination Committee, including representatives of the government, employers, and the trade unions. The Tripartite conference for the steel industry came to a first agreement, concluded on 19 March 1979 and included in the law of 8 June 1979, on restructuring and modernisation of the steel industry. This institutionalised cooperation between the social partners has since been described as the "Luxembourg model". The Tripartite made it possible to use consensus to manage a structural crisis which was becoming a problem of national solidarity. Two measures in particular allowed heavy industry to reduce its headcount without massive layoffs: on the one hand, the creation of a "Division Anti-Crise" – the DAC – employing the workers who were the victims of rationalisation efforts, on the other hand, the installation of an obligatory pre-retirement at 57 years for steel industry workers. The operation was financed by a national solidarity tax.

National solidarity was also involved in as much as the government injected public funds in ARBED's modernisation programme. The State became a shareholder of the company. Supported by public aid, Luxembourgish steel invested 16,2 billion francs between 1975 and 1979 in order to improve its competitiveness compared with its foreign rivals.

From 1976, the government relaunched its efforts to attract foreign investors. From 1972 to 1974, in a context of economic overheating, the policy of industrial diversification had been paused. The crisis led the authorities to actively seek the setting up of new businesses in the South of the country. In 1977, the government presented a bill to create the National Credit and Investment Company (Société nationale de crédit et d’investissement—SNCI), a public banking institution that was empowered to provide infrastructure loans and export loans to businesses, and invest in Luxembourgish companies. A new instrument for state intervention, the SNCI served to implement the structural policy to make the domestic economy more competitive. The closing of General Motors in Bascharage in 1978, and of the Monsanto factory in Echternach represented setbacks to the government's diversification policy.

Social policy 
Despite the crisis, the Thorn government achieved part of its social programme. In 1975, it introduced a fifth week of paid holiday, and made the sliding-scale of salaries and benefits generally applicable. The other part of its social policy was the fight against unemployment. To attenuate the effects the restructuring, the government took a number of measures: reorganising the Employment Administration, reform of the system of unemployment benefits, and creation of an Unemployment Fund.

Ministers

15 June 1974 – 21 July 1976

21 July 1976 – 16 September 1977

16 September 1977 – 16 July 1979

References 

Ministries of Luxembourg
History of Luxembourg (1945–present)
Democratic Party (Luxembourg)
1974 establishments in Luxembourg
1979 disestablishments in Luxembourg
Cabinets established in 1974
Cabinets disestablished in 1979